Prashna's Secret is a 1922 German silent adventure film directed by Ludwig Baetz and starring Hermann Leffler, Fern Andra, and Leopold von Ledebur.

The film's sets were designed by the art director Jacek Rotmil.

Cast

References

Bibliography

External links

1922 films
Films of the Weimar Republic
German silent feature films
German black-and-white films
1922 adventure films
German adventure films
Silent adventure films
1920s German films